Ottmar Georg Edenhofer (born 8 July 1961) is a German economist who is regarded as one of the world's leading experts on climate change policy, environmental and energy policy, and energy economics. His work has been heavily cited. Edenhofer currently holds the professorship of the Economics of Climate Change at the Technical University of Berlin. Together with Earth scientist Johan Rockström, economist Ottmar Edenhofer is scientific director of the Potsdam Institute for Climate Impact Research (PIK), representing the interdisciplinary and solutions-oriented approach of the institute. Furthermore, he is director of the Mercator Research Institute on Global Commons and Climate Change (MCC). From 2008 to 2015 he served as one of the co-chairs of the Intergovernmental Panel on Climate Change (IPCC) Working Group III "Mitigation of Climate Change".

Edenhofer is a member of the German National Academy of Sciences Leopoldina and of the German Academy of Science and Engineering (acatech). In 2020 Professor Edenhofer was honoured with the most prestigious environmental prize in Germany the Environment Prize (German Environment Foundation) for his groundbreaking work in the field of carbon pricing. Before, he was awarded the Romano-Guardini-Prize by the Katholische Akademie in Bayern.

Education
Edenhofer was born in Gangkofen, Lower Bavaria, Germany. He completed his Diploma in Economics with honors at the Ludwig Maximilian University of Munich. He belonged the Jesuit Order from 1987 to 1994 and following his novitiate earned a bachelor's degree in Philosophy at the Munich School of Philosophy. During this time he also founded an enterprise in the public health sector and led a humanitarian aid organization in Croatia and Bosnia from 1991 to 1993. After leaving the Order, Edenhofer worked as a research assistant from 1994 to 2000 and completed his PhD in economics summa cum laude at the Technical University of Darmstadt in 1999 under the supervision of Prof. Dr. Carlo C. Jäger.

Career
In 2018, Edenhofer was appointed Director of the Potsdam Institute for Climate Impact Research with Earth scientist Johan Rockström. Previously, Edenhofer was Deputy Director and Chief Economist at the Potsdam Institute for Climate Impact Research (PIK), where he headed Research Area III ("Sustainable Solutions Strategies").

Since June 2020 Edenhofer is project lead of the major Copernicus research activity Ariadne on the German energy transition. The project is investigating options how climate targets can be met with socially accepted policy instruments 

From 2008 to 2015 he served as a co-chair of Working Group III "Mitigation of Climate Change" of the (IPCC). Under his leadership as co-chair, the IPCC published the Special Report on Renewable Energy Sources and Climate Change Mitigation (SRREN), and the Fifth Assessment Report on Climate Change in 2014. In 2012 he became director of the newly founded Mercator Research Institute on Global Commons and Climate Change (MCC).

From 2004 to 2008 Edenhofer was a lead author of the Fourth Assessment Report on Climate Change published by the Intergovernmental Panel on Climate Change (IPCC) in 2007. The IPCC was awarded the Nobel Peace Prize in the same year.

Since 2008, Edenhofer holds the professorship for the Economics of Climate Change at the Technical University of Berlin.

Other activities and advisory roles 
Edenhofer has advised German Chancellor Angela Merkel, and Federal President Frank-Walter Steinmeier on carbon pricing. Edenhofer was asked to submit an expertise on carbon pricing  options to the German Council of Economic Experts. In 2021, Edenhofer was appointed to the Vatican's Dicastry for Promoting Integral Human Development by Pope Francis.

Edenhofer is a member of the OECD Advisory Council “Growth, Investment and the Low-Carbon Transition”. At the invitation of Ségolène Royal and Feike Sijbesma, Co-Chairs of the Carbon Pricing Leadership Coalition (CPLC) High Level Assembly, he became a member of the High-Level Commission on Carbon Prices – co-chaired by Joseph Stiglitz and Nicholas Stern – in 2019/20. In June 2021, he was appointed to the World Bank–International Monetary Fund High-Level Advisory Group (HLAG) on Sustainable and Inclusive Recovery and Growth, co-chaired by Mari Pangestu, Ceyla Pazarbasioglu, and Nicholas Stern.

In addition, Edenhofer holds the following unpaid or paid honorary positions:

 Since 2007: Fellow of the Academy of Sciences in Hamburg, Germany
Since 2008: Member of the German Association Socialpolitik, Research Committee Environmental and Resource Economics
2012-2016: Member of the Foundation Council of Munich Re
2012-2019: Member of the Advisory Committee, Green Growth Knowledge Platform (GGKP) (a joint effort of the Global Green Growth Institute, the Organisation for Economic Co-operation and Development (OECD), the United Nations Environment Programme (UNEP), and the World Bank)
2012: Member of the Advisory Committee of the Green Growth Knowledge Platform (GGKP)
2013: Chair of the Euro-CASE Energy Platform
Since 2015: Member of the German Academy of Science and Engineering (acatech)
Since 2015: Member of the Advisory Council of the Carbon Mitigation Initiative (CMI) der Princeton University
Since 2016: Member of the Sustainability Council of Volkswagen
Since 2016: Editor of Review of Environmental Economics and Policy (REEP)
Since 2018: Member of the High-Level Commission on Carbon Prices
 Since 2018: Member of the German National Academy of Science Leopoldina
Since 2018: Member of the Scientific Advisory Board to the European Institute on Economics and the Environment (EIEE)
Since 2019: Co-Chair of the Wissenschaftsplattform Klimaschutz
 Since 2019: Member of the Scientific Advisory Council of the ZEW - Leibniz Centre for European Economic Research
 Since 2019: Member of the Advisory Board of the Laudato Sí Research Institute (LSRI)
Since 2019: Member of the Food System Economics Commission (EAT)
Since 2021: Elected member of the Central Committee of German Catholics
Since 2021: Deputy chair of the Sustainability Advisory Board of the state of Brandenburg
Since 2021: Member of the High-Level Advisory Group on Sustainable and Inclusive Recovery and Growth (HLAG)

Besides his teaching and research activities, Edenhofer actively contributes to public debates about political climate protection measures in Germany and the European Union.

Research interests 
Edenhofer's research explores the impact of induced technological change on mitigation costs and mitigation strategies, the value capture and distribution of land rents, and the design of instruments for climate and energy policy. He specializes in the economics of atmospheric stabilization, social cost-benefit analysis, land value tax, sustainability theory, economic growth theory, environmental economics, welfare theory, and general intertemporal equilibrium theory.

Philosophy and position on climate change
Edenhofer says that his interest in philosophy and economics was influenced by his readings of the works of Henry George, Karl Marx, Max Weber, Ludwig Wittgenstein, and John Dewey. Regarding climate change he says: "Denying out and out that climate change is a problem for humanity, as some cynics do, is an unethical, unacceptable position."

Edenhofer is a proponent of carbon pricing. He points out that both cap-and-trade and a direct carbon tax can be implemented to reduce greenhouse emissions and encourage innovation to preserve the climate. He feels strongly that moving the global economy to a low-carbon threshold requires huge increases in the use of renewable energy across all economic sectors.

Publications
 
 List of publications by Ottmar Edenhofer

See also 
 German Academy of Science and Engineering (acatech)
 Potsdam Institute for Climate Impact Research (PIK)

References

External links

 Chair of Economics of Climate Change at the Technical University of Berlin
 IPCC Working Group III
 Michael Otto Foundation
 Ottmar Edenhofer at the Potsdam Institute for Climate Impact Research (PIK)
 Potsdam Institute for Climate Impact Research (PIK) – Research Domain III (Sustainable Solutions)
 Stiftung Mercator

1961 births
German economists
Living people
Ludwig Maximilian University of Munich alumni
Academic staff of the Technical University of Berlin
Technische Universität Darmstadt alumni
Institute for New Economic Thinking
Members of the German Academy of Sciences Leopoldina